The 2012 Richmond Kickers season was the club's twentieth season of existence. It was the Kicker's sixth-consecutive year in the third-tier of American soccer, playing in the USL Professional Division for their second season.

After a slow start for the first two-thirds of the regular season, a four-match winning streak catapulted the Kickers into the top half of the table, thus qualifying them for the playoffs, making it the ninth consecutive season that the Kickers made the playoffs of any league they were participating in. In the first round of the playoffs, Richmond lost 3–2 by the Wilmington Hammerheads thus ending their postseason ambitions.

Richmond also reached the third round of the 2012 U.S. Open Cup, where in extra time, they lost to Major League Soccer side, D.C. United.

Background 

The 2011 campaign marked the Kickers' debut in the newly created USL Pro League, which assumed the role as the third division of American soccer. During the regular season, Richmond finished third in their division and third in the overall table, making it the first time since 2005 that the Kickers did not finish the regular season either as the regular season champion or finalist. In the playoffs, the Kickers were eliminated by Commissioner's Cup winners and eventual USL Pro champions, Orlando City.

Outside of league play, Richmond made one of their deepest runs in the U.S. Open Cup, the domestic knockout cup competition. The Kickers reached the semifinals of the tournament after knocking out two Major League Soccer clubs, Columbus Crew and Sporting Kansas City in the third round and quarterfinals, respectively. The last time Richmond reached the semifinals of the Open Cup was in 1995, when the Kickers won their lone U.S. Open Cup title.

Off the field, the Kicker organization posted their fourth highest average attendance in club history.

Review

Offseason 

On December 6, 2011, the Kickers signed Pittsburgh Riverhounds' Jason Yeisley on a free transfer.

From January 20–22, the Kickers hosted their fourteenth player combine and had open tryouts.

On January 30, 2012, the club announced their preseason schedule, which included fixtures against several local college soccer teams.

Preseason 

The Kickers are expected to begin preseason training camp in February.

April 

The Richmond Kickers opened the regular season with home and away fixtures against long-time rivals, Charleston Battery, and the defending USL Pro regular season and postseason champions, Orlando City, earning a win, a draw and two losses during the four-match span. Richmond's home opener was on April 7 against Charleston in front of a crowd of 5,009. The Kickers suffered a 2–1 home defeat to the Battery thanks to a pair of goals from Charleston's Jose Cuevas, who netted in the 41st and 67th minutes of the match. The Kickers lone goal came from Stanley Nyazamba, who tallied for the home side in the 65th minute. The following weekend, the Kickers traveled south to Charleston, South Carolina to play the Battery at their home venue, Blackbaud Stadium. In front of a sold-out crowd of 4,729, the Kickers earned a last-minute, 2–1 victory over the Battery thanks to a goal from longtime defender, Sascha Görres. The Kickers' other goal came from Nyazamba, who netted his second of the campaign.

On April 21, the Kickers returned home to take on the defending USL Pro champions, Orlando City, who had been hot off a 2–0–0 start. In front of a crowd of 3,169; the Kickers were shutout at home by Orlando, as they suffered a second-straight home defeat, losing 2–0 in the process. City's two goals both came in the second half off a 61st-minute strike from Luke Boden, and an 89th minute penalty kick from Anthony Pulis. The return leg was the following weekend, where Richmond ended Orlando's six-matching winning streak (including last season), where the Kickers drew City 0–0 at the Citrus Bowl in Orlando, Florida.

Competitions

Preseason

USL Pro regular season

Standings

Match reports

USL Pro Playoffs

U.S. Open Cup

Statistics

Appearances and goals

|}

Top scorers

Disciplinary record

Transfers

In

Out

Loan in

Loan out

See also 
 2012 in American soccer
 2012 USL Pro season
 Richmond Kickers

References 

2012 USL Pro season
2012
American soccer clubs 2012 season
2012 in sports in Virginia